Lewis Steven E. Burton (born 23 March 1992) is a British model and former professional tennis player.

Early life
Lewis Steven E. Burton was born in the Bexley area of London on 23 March 1992.

Career
Burton started playing tennis at the age of seven. He reached a career-high ranking of 172 (singles and doubles combined) on the Juniors circuit, achieved in July 2010. Along with George Morgan, he reached the final of the boys' doubles at Wimbledon in 2010. However, they lost the final 6–7(4), 4–6 to the fellow British pairing of Liam Broady and Tom Farquharson. The following year, Morgan won the boys' doubles title with Mate Pavić, with Burton being too old to compete. In 2012, Burton and Morgan, now both too old for the boys' tournament, were given a wildcard into qualifying for the men's doubles at Wimbledon. They qualified for the main draw, but lost to Steve Darcis and Olivier Rochus in the first round, by a scoreline of 6–4, 5–7, 6–7(3), 4–6.

Personal life 
Burton began dating television presenter Caroline Flack in August 2019. On 12 December 2019, police were called to Flack's flat in London after she allegedly assaulted Burton by hitting him in the head with a lamp. Burton called the police from Flack's flat and was allegedly "begging for help" from the operator, with Burton saying "she tried to kill me mate". Flack's lawyer stated during proceedings that Burton did not consider himself a victim, instead describing him as a witness. Flack died by suicide in her flat on 15 February 2020. 

Since November 2020, he has been in a relationship with model and entrepreneur Lottie Tomlinson. Their son was born in August 2022.

Career finals

Doubles: 42 (26–16)

References

External links
 
 
 LTA profile

1992 births
Living people
English male tennis players
People from Bexley
Tennis people from Greater London
British male tennis players
British models